Palestina is a town located in northern Guayas, Ecuador. It is the seat of Palestina Canton, created in 1988.

As of the census of 2001, there are 14,067 people residing within canton limits. 

The most important river is the Daule River, used for transportation. St Bartholomew is the patron saint of Palestina.

Populated places in Guayas Province